{{DISPLAYTITLE:C2H7NO}}
C2H7NO may refer to:
 1-Aminoethanol, an organic compound with the formula CHCH(NH)OH
 N,O-Dimethylhydroxylamine, a methylated hydroxylamine commercially available as its hydrochloride salt
 Ethanolamine, an organic chemical compound with the formula HOCH2CH2NH2